Rough Ridin' Red is a 1928 American silent Western film directed by Louis King and starring Buzz Barton, Frank Rice and Ethan Laidlaw.

Cast
 Buzz Barton as David 'Red' Hepner 
 Frank Rice as Hank Robbins 
 Jim Welch as Pap Curtis 
 Bert Moorhouse as Sheriff Jerry Martin 
 Ethan Laidlaw as Cal Rogers 
 Betty Welsh

References

Bibliography
 Langman, Larry. A Guide to Silent Westerns. Greenwood Publishing Group, 1992.

External links
 

1928 films
1928 Western (genre) films
American black-and-white films
Films directed by Louis King
Film Booking Offices of America films
Silent American Western (genre) films
1920s English-language films
1920s American films